Trango may refer to:

TranGO, a public transit agency in Washington, US
Trango Towers, a rock formation in Pakistan
Trango Glacier, in Pakistan
UP Trango, a German paraglider design
Trango Virtual Processors, a software company